Zlatina Deliradeva is a Bulgarian choral conductor.

Biography
Zlatina Deliradeva was born on 24 September 1942 in Chirpan, Bulgaria. She was educated at the Bulgarian State Conservatory, now National Music Academy, where she studied choral conducting with the founder of the Bulgarian choral school Prof. Georgi Dimitrov and with Prof. Samuil Vidas.

In 1972 Zlatina Deliradeva became Conductor-in-Chief of the Detska Kitka Choir of Plovdiv, Bulgaria and her artistic biography has been closely linked with this choir. In the ensuing decades, Prof. Deliradeva consolidated the choir as one of the leading Bulgarian choral ensembles, winning a series of national and international awards from choral competitions and festivals across Eastern and Western Europe.

Zlatina Deliradeva is a professor of Choral Conducting at the Plovdiv Academy of Music, Dance and Fine Arts and one of the leading conducting pedagogues in the country. Between 1999 and 2008 she was the Academy’s Vice-Rector of Artistic Affairs and Postgraduate Studies.

Prof. Deliradeva is the recipient of the Best Conductor Award from the international choral competition in Celje (Slovenia), the Golden Lyre Award of the Union of Bulgarian Musicians and Dancers, the St. St. Cyril and Methodius Order, the Plovdiv Award for Music, the Copper Chan Award and the Crystal Lyre Award of the Union of Bulgarian Musicians and Dancers, the Bulgarian Ministry of Culture and Radio FM Classic (2007). She is Honorary Citizen of her hometown Chirpan and received the Honorary Sign of Plovdiv (2007).

Awards and achievements with Detska Kitka Choir
 2007 Crystal Lyre Award for Outstanding Achievement in the Performing Arts of the Union of Bulgarian Musicians and Dancers, the Bulgarian Ministry of Culture and Radio FM Classic
 2006 International Festival of Advent and Christmas Music, Prague, Czech Republic – Festival Grand Prix; Gold Medal in Children’s Category
 1999 International Choir Competition of Flanders, Maasmechelen, Belgium – 3rd Prize, Women’s Category
 1998 International Choir Competition, Halle, Germany – The Gunter Erdman Special Award for best interpretation of a contemporary choral work
 1997 The Golden Lyre Award of the Union of Bulgarian Musicians and Dancers
 1996 The Plovdiv Award for achievement in the field of music
 1995 International Choir Competition, Cantonigros, Spain – 3rd Prize in Children’s Category
 1989 Prof. Georgi Dimitrov International Choir Competition, Varna, Bulgaria – Winner
 1987 International Choir Competition, Arnhem,  Netherlands – 3rd Prize
 1984 Bela Bartok International Choir Competition, Debrecen, Hungary – Winner, Folklore Category; 2nd Prize, Contemporary Music Category
 1981 International Choir Competition, Celje, Slovenia—Winner

References
Bulgarian Children Grab Grand Prix at International Carols Festival, Novinite.com, Sofia News Agency

Detska Kitka returns with the Grand Prix of the International Festival of Advent and Christmas Music in Prague, Bulgarian Ministry of Culture website, in Bulgarian

Bulgarian Children's Choirs on the International Stage, Bulgarian National Radio, in Bulgarian

Distinciones otorgadas a artistas búlgaros en el 2006, Bulgarian National Radio

Prof. Zlatina Deliradeva with the Crystal Lyre Award, News.bg, in Bulgarian

External links
Official Website of the Detska Kitka Choir
Biographic entry for Zlatina Deliradeva, Academy of Music, Dance and Fine Arts Plovdiv (choose name from faculty menu

Bulgarian conductors (music)
Bulgarian choral conductors
1942 births
Living people
21st-century conductors (music)